Kuok Io Keong (born 12 April 1976 in Macau) is best known as a race driver.

He has raced in the Macau and Asian Touring Car Championships and will race for Corsa Motorsport in the final round of the 2011 World Touring Car Championship.

Career results

Complete World Touring Car Championship results
(key) (Races in bold indicate pole position) (Races in italics indicate fastest lap)

† Season still in progress

References
 
 WTCC Profile
 Corsa Motorsport Webpage

Living people
1976 births
Macau racing drivers
World Touring Car Championship drivers